Galatia is a village in Saline County, Illinois, in the United States. As of the 2010 census, the village population was 933.

History
Galatia is named for Albert Gallatin.  The village was established as a tobacco farming hub in the mid-1800s.  Tobacco grown in the area was hauled to Shawneetown to be shipped along the Ohio River.  Two coal mines opened near Galatia in the early 1900s, the Harco Mine and the Galatia Colliers Mine.

Geography
Galatia is located at  (37.840409, -88.610815).

There are coal mines in the vicinity of Galatia which have been used for climate change studies.

Demographics

As of the census of 2010, there were 933 people, 420 households, and 262 families residing in the village. The racial makeup of the village was 98.12% White, 0.10% African American, 0.49% Native American, 0.20% from other races, and 1.09% from two or more races. Hispanic or Latino of any race were 0.89% of the population.

There were 420 households, out of which 26.9% had children under the age of 18 living with them, 49.5% were married couples living together, 10.5% had a female householder with no husband present, and 37.4% were non-families. 35.5% of all households were made up of individuals, and 21.4% had someone living alone who was 65 years of age or older. The average household size was 2.26 and the average family size was 2.95.

In the village, the population was spread out, with 21.0% under the age of 18, 10.7% from 18 to 24, 21.1% from 25 to 44, 20.6% from 45 to 64, and 26.6% who were 65 years of age or older. The median age was 43 years. For every 100 females, there were 75.3 males. For every 100 females age 18 and over, there were 74.7 males.

The median income for a household in the village was $23,750, and the median income for a family was $30,833. Males had a median income of $25,956 versus $16,154 for females. The per capita income for the village was $12,810. About 12.9% of families and 16.7% of the population were below the poverty line, including 25.1% of those under age 18 and 14.1% of those age 65 or over.

Education 
Galatia School District is one of four in Saline County. The other three school districts are Eldorado, Harrisburg, and Carrier Mills.

Notable people
James D. Fowler, law enforcement officer and state legislator, was born in Galatia.

References

Villages in Saline County, Illinois
Villages in Illinois